Tamsen McGarry (born 11 February 1982) is an Irish alpine skier. She competed in two events at the 2002 Winter Olympics. She was the first winter Olympian for Ireland.

References

External links
 

1982 births
Living people
Irish female alpine skiers
Olympic alpine skiers of Ireland
Alpine skiers at the 2002 Winter Olympics
Sportspeople from Bolton
People educated at Rathdown School